The 2019–20 daytime network television schedule for the five major English-language commercial broadcast networks in the United States covers the weekday and weekend daytime hours from September 2019 to August 2020. The schedule is followed by a list per network of returning series; no new series or series canceled after the 2018–19 season are included at present, as the daytime schedules of the four major networks that offer morning and/or afternoon programming is expected to remain consistent with the prior television season.

Affiliates fill time periods not occupied by network programs with local or syndicated programming. PBS – which offers daytime programming through a children's program block, PBS Kids – is not included, as its member television stations have local flexibility over most of their schedules and broadcast times for network shows may vary. Fox does not offer daytime network programming nor network news on weekdays; as such, schedules are only included for Saturdays and Sundays. Also not included are MyNetworkTV (as the programming service also does not offer daytime programs of any kind), and Ion Television (as its schedule is composed mainly of syndicated reruns).

Legend

 New series are highlighted in bold.

Schedule
 All times correspond to U.S. Eastern and Pacific Time scheduling (except for some live sports or events). Except where affiliates slot certain programs outside their network-dictated timeslots, subtract one hour for Central, Mountain, Alaska, and Hawaii-Aleutian times.
 Local schedules may differ, as affiliates have the option to pre-empt or delay network programs. Such scheduling may be limited to preemptions caused by local or national breaking news or weather coverage (which may force stations to tape delay certain programs in overnight timeslots or defer them to a co-operated station or digital subchannel in their regular timeslot) and any major sports events scheduled to air in a weekday timeslot (mainly during major holidays). Stations may air shows at other times at their preference.

Monday–Friday
{| class=wikitable
! width="1.5%" bgcolor="#C0C0C0" colspan="2"|Network
! width="4%" bgcolor="#C0C0C0"|7:00 am
! width="4%" bgcolor="#C0C0C0"|7:30 am
! width="4%" bgcolor="#C0C0C0"|8:00 am
! width="4%" bgcolor="#C0C0C0"|8:30 am
! width="4%" bgcolor="#C0C0C0"|9:00 am
! width="4%" bgcolor="#C0C0C0"|9:30 am
! width="4%" bgcolor="#C0C0C0"|10:00 am
! width="4%" bgcolor="#C0C0C0"|10:30 am
! width="4%" bgcolor="#C0C0C0"|11:00 am
! width="4%" bgcolor="#C0C0C0"|11:30 am
! width="4%" bgcolor="#C0C0C0"|noon
! width="4%" bgcolor="#C0C0C0"|12:30 pm
! width="4%" bgcolor="#C0C0C0"|1:00 pm
! width="4%" bgcolor="#C0C0C0"|1:30 pm
! width="4%" bgcolor="#C0C0C0"|2:00 pm
! width="4%" bgcolor="#C0C0C0"|2:30 pm
! width="4%" bgcolor="#C0C0C0"|3:00 pm
! width="4%" bgcolor="#C0C0C0"|3:30 pm
! width="4%" bgcolor="#C0C0C0"|4:00 pm
! width="4%" bgcolor="#C0C0C0"|4:30 pm
! width="4%" bgcolor="#C0C0C0"|5:00 pm
! width="4%" bgcolor="#C0C0C0"|5:30 pm
! width="4%" bgcolor="#C0C0C0"|6:00 pm
! width="4%" bgcolor="#C0C0C0"|6:30 pm
! width="4%" bgcolor="#C0C0C0"|7:00 pm
! width="4%" bgcolor="#C0C0C0"|7:30 pm
|-
! bgcolor="#C0C0C0" rowspan=3|ABC
! Fall
| bgcolor="gold" colspan="4" rowspan="3"|Good Morning America
| bgcolor="white" colspan="4" rowspan="3"|Local and/orsyndicated programming
| bgcolor="yellow" colspan="2" rowspan="3"|The View
| bgcolor="white" colspan="2" rowspan="3"|Local and/orsyndicated programming
| bgcolor="gold" colspan="2"|GMA3: Keke Palmer, Michael Strahan, and That Other Lady
| bgcolor="chartreuse" colspan="2" rowspan="3"|General Hospital*
| bgcolor="white" colspan="7" rowspan="3"|Local and/orsyndicated programming
| bgcolor="gold" rowspan="3"|ABC World News Tonight with David Muir
| colspan="2" rowspan="5" |Local and/or snydicated programming
|-
! Spring
| bgcolor="gold" colspan=2|Pandemic: What You Need to Know
|-
! Summer
| bgcolor="gold" colspan=2|GMA3: What You Need To Know
|-
! bgcolor="#C0C0C0" colspan="2"|CBS
| bgcolor="gold" colspan="4"|CBS This Morning
| bgcolor="white" colspan="2"|Local and/orsyndicated programming
| bgcolor="pink" colspan="2"|Let's Make a Deal
| bgcolor="pink" colspan="2"|The Price Is Right| bgcolor="white"|Local and/or  syndicated programming
| bgcolor="chartreuse" colspan="2"|The Young and the Restless| bgcolor="chartreuse"|The Bold and the Beautiful| bgcolor="yellow" colspan="2"|The Talk| bgcolor="white" colspan="7"|Local and/orsyndicated programming
| bgcolor="gold"|CBS Evening News with Norah O'Donnell|-
! bgcolor="#C0C0C0" colspan="2"|NBC
| bgcolor="gold" colspan="4"|Today| bgcolor="gold" colspan="2"|Today Third Hour| bgcolor="gold" colspan="2"|Today with Hoda & Jenna| bgcolor="white" colspan="4"|Local and/orsyndicated programming
| bgcolor="chartreuse" colspan="2"|Days of Our Lives| bgcolor="white" colspan="9"|Local and/orsyndicated programming
| bgcolor="gold"|NBC Nightly News with Lester Holt|-
! bgcolor="#C0C0C0" colspan="2"|CW
| bgcolor="white" colspan="18"|Local and/orsyndicated programming
| bgcolor="lightgray" colspan="2"|The Jerry Springer Show 
| bgcolor="white" colspan="6"|Local and/orsyndicated programming
|}

Notes:
 ABC, NBC and CBS offer their early morning newscasts via a looping feed (usually running as late as 10:00 a.m. Pacific Time) to accommodate local scheduling in the westernmost contiguous time zones or for use a filler programming for stations that do not offer a local morning newscast; some stations without a morning newscast may air syndicated or time-lease programs instead of the full newscast loop.
 CBS stations have the option of airing Let's Make a Deal at either 10:00 a.m. or 3:00 p.m. Eastern, depending on the station's choice of feed.
 While Third Hour and Hoda and Jenna are part of the Today Show, they are promoted by NBC as their own distinct programs.
 ABC stations have the option of airing General Hospital at 2:00 or 3:00 p.m. Eastern Time, depending on the station's choice of feed.

Saturday

Sunday

Notes:
 (‡) ABC and Fox do not handle programming responsibilities for their programming blocks, but offers syndicated blocks of E/I-compliant programming that are intended for exclusive distribution to their stations. Litton's Weekend Adventure is offered to ABC stations by arrangement with Litton Entertainment and Xploration Station is offered to Fox stations by arrangement with Steve Rotfeld Productions.
 To comply with FCC educational programming regulations, stations may defer certain programs featured in their respective network's E/I program blocks to determined weekend late morning or afternoon time periods if a sporting event is not scheduled in the timeslot or in place of paid programming that would otherwise be scheduled.
 Airtimes of sporting events may vary depending on the offerings scheduled for that weekend. Scheduling overruns may occur due to events going into overtime, weather delays or other game stoppages, preempting scheduled local or syndicated programming.

By network

ABC
Returning series:ABC World News TonightAmerica This MorningESPN on ABC
ESPN College Football on ABCGeneral HospitalGMA3: Strahan, Sara and Keke Good Morning AmericaLitton's Weekend Adventure‡Jack Hanna's Wild CountdownHearts of HeroesOcean Treks with Jeff CorwinRock the ParkThis Week with George StephanopoulosThe ViewNew series:
Litton's Weekend Adventure‡Oh Baby! with Anji CorleyXFLNot returning from 2018–19:
Litton's Weekend Adventure‡The Great Dr. ScottVacation CreationCBS

Returning series:
CBS Dream TeamLucky DogThe Henry Ford's Innovation Nation with Mo RoccaHope in the WildPet Vet Dream TeamLet's Make a DealThe Bold and the BeautifulThe Price Is RightThe TalkThe Young and the RestlessCBS Evening NewsCBS Morning NewsCBS News Sunday MorningCBS Sports
College Football on CBS / SEC on CBS
NFL on CBSThe NFL TodayCBS This MorningCBS This Morning SaturdayFace the NationLet's Make a DealThe Bold and the BeautifulThe Price Is RightThe TalkThe Young and the RestlessNew series:
CBS Dream TeamBest Friends Furever with Kel MitchellMission Unstoppable with Miranda CosgroveNot returning from 2018–19:
CBS Dream TeamDr. Chris: Pet VetThe InspectorsTails of ValorFox
Returning series:Fox News SundayFox Sports
Fox College FootballFox NFL KickoffFox NFL SundayWeekend MarketplaceXploration Station‡Xploration Awesome PlanetXploration DIY SciXploration Earth 2050Xploration Nature Knows BestXploration Outer SpaceXploration Weird But TrueNew series:Fox Big Noon KickoffXFL on FoxThe CW
Returning series:The Jerry Springer Show 
One Magnificent MorningChicken Soup for the Soul's Animal TalesDid I Mention Invention? with Alie WardThis Old House: Trade SchoolNew series:
One Magnificent MorningJack Hanna's Into the Wild Jewels of the Natural WorldNot returning from 2018–19:
One Magnificent MorningChicken Soup for the Soul's Hidden HeroesReady, Set, PetWelcome HomeThe Wildlife DocsNBC
Returning series:Days of Our LivesEarly TodayMeet the PressThe More You KnowThe Champion Within with Lauren ThompsonConsumer 101Earth Odyssey with Dylan DreyerVets Saving PetsNBC Nightly NewsTodaySunday Today with Willie GeistToday Third HourToday with Hoda & JennaNew series:
The More You KnowA New LeafRoots Less TraveledNot returning from 2018–19:
The More You KnowNaturally, Danny SeoThe Voyager with Josh GarciaRenewals and cancellations
Series renewals
ABCThe View—Renewed for a 23rd season on September 9, 2019.General Hospital—Renewed for a 58th season on September 23, 2019.Strahan, Sara and Keke—Renewed for a 2nd season on September 23, 2019.

CBSThe Bold and the Beautiful—Renewed for a 32nd season on April 30, 2019.Let's Make a Deal—Renewed for an eleventh season on April 30, 2019.The Price is Right—Renewed for a 48th season on April 30, 2019.The Talk—Renewed for a tenth season on April 30, 2019.The Young and the Restless—Renewed for a 47th season on April 30, 2019.

FoxXFL on Fox —Renewed through the 2022 season on May 6, 2019.

NBCDays of Our Lives''—Renewed for a 55th season (running through September 2020) on January 8, 2019.

Cancellations

ABC
After initially agreeing to carry the XFL through 2022, in late June 2020, ABC and ESPN Inc. filed to terminate its agreement with the league.

See also
2019–20 United States network television schedule (prime-time)
2019–20 United States network television schedule (late night)

References

Sources
 
 
 

United States weekday network television schedules
2019 in American television
2020 in American television